Badagabanangala  is a village in the southern state of Karnataka, India. It is located in the Virajpet taluk of Kodagu district in Karnataka.

Demographics
As of 2001 India census, Badagabanangala had a population of 5326 with 2611 males and 2715 females.

See also
 Kodagu
 Districts of Karnataka
 Madikeri
 Mangalore

References

External links
 http://Kodagu.nic.in/

Villages in Kodagu district